The Aftermath is the fourth studio album by the German Symphonic/folk metal band Midnattsol. It was released in 2018 on Napalm Records.

A music videos was made for the cover of the medieval piece "Herr Mannelig" (with lyrics in Swedish and featuring the making-of footage from the recording sessions) and for "The Purple Sky", directed by Michael Rother and Tim Loeschmann.

A limited edition was released with a bonus track.

Background 
The Aftermath represents the return of the band to the recording studios, after seven years in break. Midnattsol mastermind, singer and main songwriter Carmen Elise Espenæs was involved in a parallel musical project called Savn, and she  was dedicated to her two sons, born in 2012 and 2014. Added to this, differences between some members of the band caused a greater delay in the production of the new album.

In December 2017, Liv Kristine (Carmen Elise's older sister), was introduced as the band's second official singer, after her sudden departure from Leaves' Eyes in 2016. Previously, bassist Birgit Öllbrunner, drummer Chris Merzinsky and guitarist Matthias Schuler left the band for personal reasons before the recording sessions began at the end of 2017.

Replacing them, producer and new member Stephan Adolph played all their instruments as session musician. Adolph (a friend of keyboardist Daniel Fischer) had already worked with Midnattsol on their debut album Where Twilight Dwells (2005)

Musical style and writing 
The album is characterized by its great compositional variety, including some slower songs than in previous works in a doom metal style such as the dark version for "Herr Mannelig", energetic themes such  as "Syns sang" (about the Germanic goddess Syn), folk ballads such as "Vem kan segla", as well as a greater number of lyrics in Norwegian.

Lyrically, in comparison to its distant predecessor The Metamorphosis Melody (2011), The Aftermath has much more Nordic folk influences, including gothic metal songs with a somber social content as "Ikje glem meg" (about 2011 Utøya massacre) or "The Aftermath". In relation to the writing, Espenæs said:
[...] There were folk elements on the other albums as well, but on our new album «The Aftermath» I definitely think it's even more, and this is a direction where we definitely are heading more and more. I feel inspired by folk songs and tales, and I love learning more about the earlier days. We didn't have any restrictions when we were writing the album, just total freedom to let the creativity flow, so we sang and played things we haven`t done before. That was a fantastic feeling, I really loved writing the songs together with the other ones.

Track listing

Personnel

Midnattsol 
 Carmen Elise Espenæs – vocals 
 Liv Kristine – vocals 
 Daniel Fischer – keyboards 
 Alex Kautz – guitars 
 Stephan Adolph – guitars, bass, vocals, drums (uncredited)

Production 
Rune Gunnar Stensøy – recording
Stephan Adolph	– mixing, mastering
Heilemania – photography, artwork
Joachim Cilslik – logo

References

2018 albums
Midnattsol albums
Napalm Records albums